The 1921 Dayton Triangles season was their second in the league. The team failed to improve on their previous output of 5–2–2, winning only four games. They finished eighth in the league.

Schedule

Standings

References

Dayton Triangles seasons
Dayton Triangles
Dayton Triangles